Olveston is a village on the Caribbean island of Montserrat.

The settlement was created as a plantation, one of two on Montserrat which were bought by Joseph Sturge (1793–1859) to demonstrate that slavery was unnecessary.

Beatles record producer George Martin lived in Olveston House, which is in the town of Salem, and set up the renowned AIR Montserrat studios nearby on Friths Road in 1979. The studio is now in ruins, after it was destroyed by Hurricane Hugo in 1979, but Olveston House operates as a guest house.

References 

Populated places in Montserrat
Salem, Montserrat